This is a list of foodborne illness outbreaks by death toll, caused by infectious disease, heavy metals, chemical contamination, or from natural toxins, such as those found in poisonous mushrooms.
Before modern microbiology, foodbourne illness was not understood, and, from the mid 1800s to early-mid 1900s, was perceived as Ptomaine Poisoning, caused by a fundamental flaw in understanding how it worked. While the medical establishment ditched Ptomaine theory by the 30s, it remained the public conscience until the late 60s and early 70s. Proper noting of such events only properly started after the Bon Vivant Outbreak of 1971, and was still limited in scope, thereby it was highly likely many large scale outbreaks from the 60s or earlier occurred, but were poorly documented and may have gone unnoticed, as even after the Bon Vivant case, prior to the 92-93 Jack in the Box Outbreak, many outbreaks were not widely reported. As such, the majority of entries on this list post-date that outbreak.

List by agent

By chemical contamination

See also
 List of epidemics
 List of food contamination incidents

References

Adulteration

foodborne
Foodborne illness outbreaks by death toll
Foodborne illness outbreaks